Gilles Bastié (born 9 February 1971) is a former professional tennis player from France.

Biography
Bastié competed on the professional tour in the 1990s. 

Most of his ATP Tour main draw appearances came in the doubles format and he made two semi-finals. This included the Bordeax Open of 1992, which he and Jordi Burillo opened with a win over Björn Borg, who was making a tour comeback, and his partner John Lloyd.

On the singles tour he qualified twice for the main draw at Bordeax, in 1994 and 1995.

At the 1996 French Open he featured in the men's doubles draw as a wildcard pairing with countryman Lionel Barthez.

Challenger titles

Doubles: (1)

References

External links
 
 

1971 births
Living people
French male tennis players